Anna Margolin is the pen name of Rosa Harning Lebensboym (1887–1952) a twentieth century Jewish Russian-American, Yiddish language poet.

Biography
Born in Brest, then part of the Russian Empire, she was educated up to secondary school level, where she studied Hebrew. She first went to New York in 1906, and permanently settled there in 1913.  Most of her poetry was written there. Margolin was associated with both the Di Yunge and ‘introspectivist’ groups in the Yiddish poetry scene at the time, but her poetry is uniquely her own.

In her early years in New York City Margolin joined the editorial staff of the liberal Yiddish daily Der Tog (The Day; founded 1914). Under her real name she edited a section entitled "In der froyen velt" (In the women's world); and also wrote journalistic articles under various pseudonyms, including "Sofia Brandt," and – more often, in the mid 1920s – "Clara Levin."

Though her reputation rests mainly on the single volume of poems she published in her lifetime, Lider ('Poems', 1929), a posthumous collection, Drunk from the Bitter Truth, including English translations has been published. One reviewer described her work as "sensual, jarring, plainspoken, and hard, the record of a soul in direct contact with the streets of 1920s New York".

Bibliography 
Poetry
 Lider. [Poems] (1929)
 Drunk from the Bitter Truth: The Poems of Anna Margolin. Translated Shirley Kumove. (SUNY, 2005)  [ Review]

References

External links 

 The Bridge Short poem in translation
 A Reading of Anna Margolin's "Mit halb farmakhte oygn"
  2 poems
  Article in Forverts
 Anna Margolin papers. YIVO Institute for Jewish Research, RG 1166.
 Jewish Women's Archive page

1887 births
1952 deaths
People from Brestsky Uyezd
Jews from the Russian Empire
Emigrants from the Russian Empire to the United States
Jewish American poets
Yiddish-language poets
Jewish women writers
American women poets
20th-century American poets
20th-century American women writers